"That '90s Show" is the eleventh episode of the nineteenth season of the American animated television series The Simpsons. It first aired on the Fox network in the United States on January 27, 2008. Kurt Loder and "Weird Al" Yankovic both guest star as themselves, this being the second time for Yankovic. The episode was written by Matt Selman, and directed by Mark Kirkland. The episode's title is a parody of That '70s Show, a television program that also aired on Fox.

After Bart and Lisa discover Marge's degree from Springfield University, Homer and Marge recount one of the darkest points of their relationship, in which Marge has an affair with a pretentious history professor and a dejected, self-destructive Homer achieves brief fame as the frontman of a grunge band.

The episode retcons some of the Simpson family history: Due to the show's long run, Homer and Marge's romance as young adults now takes place during the 1990s instead of the late 1970s – early 1980s per previous episodes. (Subsequent episodes would return to the earlier time frame.)

Plot
The Simpson family is suffering inside their freezing house because Homer (counting on global warming) did not pay the heating bill. Bart and Lisa, searching for items to feed the fire, discover a box containing a degree belonging to Marge from Springfield University. Homer and Marge look shocked to find it, and claim it was from their dating years, confusing Bart as Marge told him he was conceived right after Marge and Homer left high school. Lisa does some calculations and realizes that, because Bart is 10, and Homer and Marge are in their mid-to-late thirties, Bart must have been born later in their parents' relationship than they thought. Marge and Homer proceed to describe one of the darker points of their relationship, the mid-to-late 1990s.

In the flashback, younger Homer and Marge are happily dating, living together in an apartment after graduating high school. Marge is an avid reader, and Homer is part of an R&B group alongside Lenny, Carl, and Officer Lou. One morning, Marge wakes up to find out she has been accepted into Springfield University, but is shocked to learn of the high cost of tuition. Homer, taking pity on Marge, decides to take up work at his father's popular laser tag warehouse in order to pay for it, where he is abused by the children. At Springfield University, Marge is impressed with her surroundings and with her radical feminist revisionist history professor Stefane August, despite Homer's disapproval.

Marge quickly admires August, and both form a mutual attraction. August begins manipulating Marge by telling her Homer is a simple "townie" who would not appreciate her intellect. A shocked Homer arrives and catches the two together. In his anger, he reinvents his R&B group with a new sound called "grunge," which Homer explains is an acronym for "Guitar Rock Utilizing Nihilist Grunge Energy." His band is renamed to "Sadgasm" and they sing a song Homer calls "Politically Incorrect" (based on "Frances Farmer Will Have Her Revenge On Seattle" and "Heart Shaped Box" by Nirvana). Marge arrives at the concert, admitting she finds Homer's new music unnerving, while Homer mocks her attraction to August, causing them to end their relationship. Marge begins dating August, leaving Homer devastated.

Homer performs a new song, called "Shave Me" (based on "Rape Me" by Nirvana), which causes him to become so famous that adoring fans surround his new mansion and "Weird Al" Yankovic performs a parody of the song, titled "Brain Freeze", leading a miserable Homer to become bored of his own fame. Marge and August accidentally hear a snippet of Homer's song during a date, shortly before sharing their first kiss. When running onto the beach, August shocks Marge by revealing that he considers marriage oppressive and misogynistic, angering Marge as she desires to get married someday. Marge breaks up with August, breaking his heart. A miserable Marge is surprised to see Homer made a song dedicated to her, called "Margerine" (based on "Glycerine" by Bush), about their relationship. A special news report with Kurt Loder (mirroring Loder's special MTV News report on April 8, 1994, announcing Kurt Cobain's death) interrupts, revealing Sadgasm have broken up and Homer is holed up in his mansion with an alleged narcotics addiction. Arriving there, Marge destroys Homer's drug needles and soon begins caring for him, although it turns out that the needles were insulin for his diabetes after he drank too many frappucinos. Whilst recovering in the hospital, Marge apologizes to Homer for her actions and he forgives her. The two reunite and have sex inside a mini-golf course, implying this is when and where they conceived Bart, though Bart and Lisa fall asleep during the revelation. As Homer and Marge end their story, August, who has been watching the couple's recollections transpire outside their window, mockingly brands them "townies" and walks away.

Cultural references 
When Homer's band is playing "Politically Incorrect", a character named "Marvin Cobain" calls his cousin Kurt Cobain on the phone and makes him listen to the song, stating that it might be the new sound he has been looking for. This is a reference to a scene from the movie Back to the Future where Marvin Berry calls his cousin Chuck Berry and makes him listen to Marty McFly playing a cover of "Johnny B. Goode". The breaking news broadcast on TV by Kurt Loder (voiced by Loder himself) self-references Loder's own breaking news broadcast on MTV News that Kurt Cobain was dead. The episode title is a reference to another popular, but live-action, Fox sitcom That '70s Show. The same title would coincidentally later be used for that show's 2023 sequel series.  The episode parodies Kurt Cobain's rise to fame with Nirvana.  Sadgasm is a parody of Nirvana, and the band's breakup references Cobain's breakup from Nirvana.  When Homer blocks himself from his fans in his mansion, this references Cobain's heroin addiction and his depression before his suicide.  Most of Sadgasm's songs are based on songs from Nirvana. In one scene, it is implied that Homer is watching Seinfeld, as the theme can be heard. He also says to Marge, "No soup for you!", and that he is the "master of his domain," which are lines from the episodes "The Soup Nazi" and "The Contest", respectively, and ponders, "Oh Elaine, will you ever find a man who's sponge-worthy?", an allusion to the episode "The Sponge".

Reception
An estimated 7.6 million viewers tuned into the episode.

Richard Keller of TV Squad enjoyed the many cultural references to the 1990s, but felt disappointed that the episode changed the continuity of The Simpsons.

Robert Canning of IGN strongly disliked the episode, also feeling that the continuity change was not a good choice. He said, "What 'That '90s Show' did was neither cool nor interesting. Instead, it insulted lifelong Simpsons fans everywhere. With this episode, the writers chose to change the history of the Simpson family." He gave the episode a 3/10, and suggested that this episode should have been set a decade earlier to fit classic Simpsons continuity. He later added that it was his least favorite episode of the nineteenth season, and that it "was an episode that [he] will be erasing from [his] personal Simpsons memory bank."

References

External links

 

The Simpsons (season 19) episodes
2008 American television episodes
Television episodes set in the 1990s
That '70s Show